Donald James "Donny" Lucas is a Canadian actor and comedian.

He is best known for voicing Disco Kid in Punch Out!!, Zed in League of Legends, Mr. Fix in Iron Man: Armored Adventures, and the Lucius Fox A.I. in Batwoman.

Early life
Donny Lucas was born, adopted, and raised in Montreal, Quebec.

Donny started his acting career in 1986 by taking classes, workshops, community theater. His first credits were for HBO, Warner Bros, and Nickelodeon.

Filmography

Film

Television

Videogames

References

External links

Living people
Black Canadian male actors
Canadian male film actors
Canadian male television actors
Canadian male voice actors
Male actors from Montreal
Year of birth missing (living people)